Latin Kaleidoscope is an album by the Kenny Clarke/Francy Boland Big Band featuring performances recorded in Germany in 1968 and released on the MPS label in Europe and also released in the US on Prestige Records.

Reception

AllMusic awarded the album 3 stars. On All About Jazz, Douglas Payne said "Latin Kaleidoscope is  two suites that are more traditionally Latinate, with the band swinging on well-written parts to a panoply of well-used percussion elements".

Track listing
All compositions by Francy Boland, except where indicated.
 "Un Graso de Areia" (Gary McFarland) - 4:57
 "Duas Rosas" (McFarland) - 2:20
 "A Rosa Negra" (McFarland) - 1:57
 "Uma Fita de Tres Cores" - 4:47
 "Olhos Negros" (McFarland) - 4:00
 "Ramo de Flores" (McFarland) - 2:00
 "Fiebre Cuban" - 2:25
 "Mambo de las Brujas" - 4:09
 "Strano Sueno" - 4:00
 "Cara Bruja" - 2:06
 "Crespusculo y Aurora" - 6:47

Personnel 
Kenny Clarke - drums
Francy Boland - piano, arranger
Benny Bailey, Jimmy Deuchar, Duško Gojković, Milo Pavlovic, Idrees Sulieman - trumpet
Nat Peck, Åke Persson, Eric van Lier - trombone
Derek Humble, Phil Woods - alto saxophone 
Johnny Griffin, Ronnie Scott, Tony Coe - tenor saxophone
Sahib Shihab - baritone saxophone, flute
Jean Warland, Jimmy Woode - bass
Kenny Clare - drums
Shake Keane, Albert Heath, Tony Inzalaco, Sabu Martinez - percussion

References 

1969 albums
Kenny Clarke/Francy Boland Big Band albums
MPS Records albums